= Mina Thiis =

Norwegian cook and cookbook writer

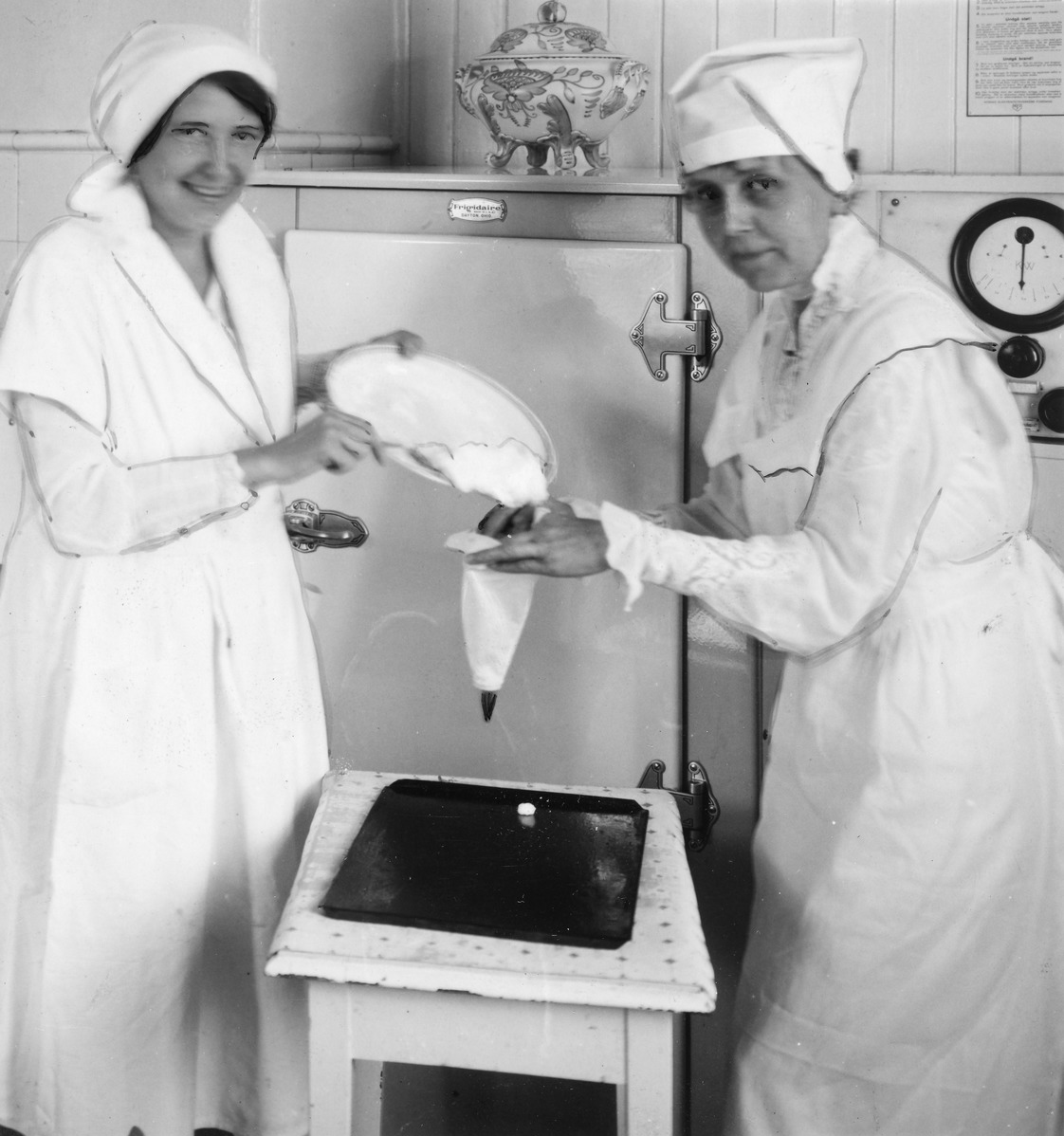
MinaThiis in the 1930s

Mina Thiis (3 January 1871, Fredrikstad – 28 January 1965) was a Norwegian cook and cookbook writer.

After attending school in the Netherlands, Scotland and France, she worked for ten years as a teacher at the Berles girls school (established 1894) from 1908 to 1918, after which she started her own Mina Thiis' household school in Inkognitogata (Oslo). She ran this until around 1930 when others took over and she herself devoted herself to writing the four cookbooks that were first published in 1932.

She was the daughter of Jens Schanche Thiis (1825–1908) and Hanna Cassandra Finne (1841–1933).
